Michael Clasper CBE (born 21 April 1953) is the British Chairman of Coats Group plc (formerly Guinness Peat Group plc (GPG)) and the former chairman of Her Majesty's Revenue and Customs (HMRC) (2008-2012).

Education 
He has an MA in Engineering from St John's College, Cambridge University.

Career 
 1974 Graduate Trainee of British Rail
 1978 Graduate Trainee, Brand Manager and then Associate Advertising Manager, Procter & Gamble, UK
 1985 Advertising Director, Procter & Gamble, UK
 1989 General Manager, Procter & Gamble, Holland
 1991 Vice President and Managing Director, Procter & Gamble, UK/Eire
 1995 Regional Vice President, Procter & Gamble, European Fabric and Homecare
 1998 President, Procter & Gamble, European Fabric and Homecare
 1999 President, Procter & Gamble, Global Home Care and New Business Development, Brussels
 2001 Deputy Chief Executive, LHR Airports Ltd
 2003 Group Chief Executive Officer, LHR Airports Ltd
 2006 Operational Managing Director, Terra Firma Capital Partners Ltd
 2008 - 2012 Chairman, HM Revenue and Customs
 2013 Non-Executive Chairman, Coats plc
 2014 Chairman of Guinness Peat Group plc
 2014 President of Chartered Management Institute

References

External links 
 Profile: Mike Clasper CBE, Chairman Guinness Peat Group plc

1953 births
Alumni of St John's College, Cambridge
British businesspeople
Living people
Chairmen of HM Revenue and Customs
Commanders of the Order of the British Empire